Blanc-Sablon may refer to:

Places

Canada
 Blanc-Sablon, Quebec, a municipality of Le Golfe-du-Saint-Laurent Regional County Municipality
 Blanc-Sablon archipelago, several islands in Blanc-Sablon Bay in Blanc-Sablon, Quebec
 Blanc-Sablon River, with mouth in Blanc-Sablon, Quebec
 Blanc-Sablon Bay, in Blanc-Sablon, Quebec
 Lourdes-de-Blanc-Sablon Airport, in Blanc-Sablon, Quebec